Qullqi (Aymara and Quechua for silver, Hispanicized spelling Colqui) is a  mountain in the Andes of Peru. It is situated in the Lima Region, Huarochirí Province, Huanza District. Qullqi lies east of the Qiwlla River (Quiula) and west of the Qullqi valley (Collque). One of the nearest places is Qullqi (Collque) southeast of the mountain.

References 

Mountains of Peru
Mountains of Lima Region